Alf Arrowsmith (11 December 1942 – 12 May 2005) was an English footballer who played as a striker.

Arrowsmith began his career in non-league football with Tintwistle Villa. The talented player made his mark scoring a massive 96 goals in the 1959–60 season - a club record which remains unbeaten today. He moved to Ashton United where he played alongside future England star Alan Ball and within weeks was spotted by an Anfield scout and signed for Liverpool in 1960 for £1500. Although he made his debut for the club the following year it was during the 1963–64 season that he really came to prominence, scoring fifteen goals in 20 league games. However a bad injury suffered in the 1964 FA Charity Shield derailed Arrowsmith's career and he never recaptured the same form again, leaving to join Bury in 1968, before finishing his career at Rochdale and Macclesfield Town.

Arrowsmith was described by Liverpool manager Bill Shankly as "a born goalscorer".

After a short illness he died in May 2005.

References

1942 births
2005 deaths
English footballers
Association football forwards
Ashton United F.C. players
Liverpool F.C. players
Bury F.C. players
Rochdale A.F.C. players
Macclesfield Town F.C. players
Footballers from Ashton-under-Lyne